Frans Herman (6 February 1927 – 21 September 1990) was a Belgian middle-distance runner. He competed in the men's 1500 metres at the 1952 Summer Olympics.

References

1927 births
1990 deaths
Athletes (track and field) at the 1952 Summer Olympics
Athletes (track and field) at the 1956 Summer Olympics
Belgian male middle-distance runners
Belgian male long-distance runners
Belgian male steeplechase runners
Olympic athletes of Belgium
Place of birth missing
20th-century Belgian people